Cheung Muk Tau may refer to:

 Cheung Muk Tau (Islands District), an island of Hong Kong, part of the Soko Islands group
 Cheung Muk Tau (Tai Po District), a village in Shap Sze Heung, Tai Po District, Hong Kong